
Year 100 BC was a year of the pre-Julian Roman calendar. At the time it was known as the Year of the Consulship of Marius and Flaccus (or, less frequently, year 654 Ab urbe condita) and the First Year of Tianhan. The denomination 100 BC for this year has been used since the early medieval period, when the Anno Domini calendar era became the prevalent method in Europe for naming years.

Events 
 By place 
 Roman Republic 
 Consuls: Lucius Valerius Flaccus, Gaius Marius (Marius's sixth consulship).
 Manius Aquillius celebrates an ovation for victories in the Second Servile War.
 Lucius Appuleius Saturninus, a tribune, passes a law to redistribute land to military veterans. The law requires that all senators swear to abide by it. Quintus Caecilus Metellus Numidicus refuses and is exiled. He goes to Rhodes to study philosophy.
 Late summer–autumn: Saturninus stands for tribune again for the following year, and is elected. His associate, the praetor Gaius Servilius Glaucia, attempts to stand for the consulship (illegally, as praetors cannot immediately become consul). A rival candidate, Gaius Memmius, is found murdered by agents of Saturninus and Glaucia, who are declared public enemies by the Senate. The Senate issues the senatus consultum ultimum, and Marius, as consul, defeats his former ally in battle in the Forum. Saturninus and his followers surrender on condition that their lives are spared, but they are stoned to death with roof tiles in the Curia Hostilia by renegade senators.
 The building of the Sanctuary of Fortuna Primigenia, Palestrina, Italy, is begun. The model of it is now kept at the Museo Archeologico Nazionale, Italy (approximate date).

 Asia Minor 
 Tigranes II of Armenia is placed on the Armenian throne by the Parthians in exchange for the cession of "seventy valleys". (approximate date)

 Judea 
 The deuterocanonical books of 1 and 2 Maccabees are written.

 India 
 Gandhara and Punjab are ruled by the Indo-Greek king Demetrius III Aniketos.

 China 
 War of the Heavenly Horses: The Han expedition under Li Guangli returns victorious to China. He is followed by dynastic representatives sent by various Central Asian kings, so that they may pay tribute to Emperor Wu of Han. Emperor Wu keeps these representatives as hostages and sends soldiers to build pavilions and reclaim wasteland along the route to the west to provide food and shelter for Han envoys.
 Han-Xiongnu War: The Han general Zhao Ponu escapes Xiongnu custody and returns to China.

 America 
 Mural room in the Maya pyramid at San Bartolo, Guatemala, painted.
 Olmec III period ends in Southeastern Mexico.

Births 
 Julius Caesar, Roman general and politician (d. 44 BC)
 Titus Labienus, Caesar's chief lieutenant in the conquest of Gaul (d. 45 BC)

Deaths 
 Cornelia, mother of Tiberius Gracchus (b. c. 190 BC)
 Gaius Memmius, Roman politician
 Gaius Servilius Glaucia, Roman politician
 Lucius Appuleius Saturninus, Roman politician
 Salvius Tryphon, Rebel slave
 Theodosius of Bithynia, Greek astronomer and mathematician (b. c. 169 BC)

References